Iotapapillomavirus is a genus of viruses, in the family Papillomaviridae. Rodents serve as natural hosts. There are two species in this genus. Diseases associated with this genus include: cutaneous lesions and benign skin tumours, such as papillomas and keratoacanthomas.

Taxonomy
The following two species are assigned to the genus:
 Iotapapillomavirus 1
 Iotapapillomavirus 2

Structure
Viruses in Iotapapillomavirus are non-enveloped, with icosahedral geometries, and T=7 symmetry. The diameter is around 60 nm. Genomes are circular, around 8kb in length.

Life cycle
Viral replication is nuclear. Entry into the host cell is achieved by attachment of the viral proteins to host receptors, which mediates endocytosis. Replication follows the dsDNA bidirectional replication model. DNA-templated transcription, with some alternative splicing mechanism is the method of transcription. The virus exits the host cell by nuclear envelope breakdown.
Rodents serve as the natural host. Transmission routes are contact.

References

External links
 ICTV Report Papillomaviridae
 Viralzone: Iotapapillomavirus

Papillomavirus
Virus genera